Thomas Christie (1761–1796) was a Scottish political writer.

Thomas or Tom Christie may also refer to:
Thomas Christie (physician) (1772/3–1829), Scottish physician 
Thomas Christie (Canadian politician) (1834–1902), Canadian politician
Thomas Christie Jr. (1855–1934), Canadian politician 
Thomas Davidson Christie (1843–1931), American missionary-educator in Turkey
Thomas P. Christie (fl. 1950s), American government figure
Tom Christie (rower) (1927–2017), English rower and doctor 
Tom Christie (rugby union) (born 1998), New Zealand rugby union player

Fictional 
Tom Christie, a character in Diana Gabaldon's Outlander book series and its TV adaptation.